Kevin Koester (born June 3, 1954) was the Iowa State Representative from the 38th District. A Republican, he served in the Iowa House of Representatives from 2009 - 2018. Koester was born in Harlan, raised in Des Moines, and resides in Ankeny. He has a B.A. in education from the University of Iowa.

, Koester served on several committees in the Iowa House – the Appropriations, Education, Human Resources, and State Government committees. He also served as the chair of the Government Oversight committee.

Electoral history 
*incumbent

References

External links 

 Representative Kevin Koester official Iowa General Assembly site
 
 Financial information (state office) at the National Institute for Money in State Politics

1954 births
University of Iowa alumni
Republican Party members of the Iowa House of Representatives
Living people
People from Harlan, Iowa
Politicians from Des Moines, Iowa
People from Ankeny, Iowa
Members of the Evangelical Free Church of America
21st-century American politicians